Tualatin Hills Park & Recreation District (THPRD) is a special parks district located in the eastern part of Washington County in the U.S. state of Oregon. Created in 1955, the district covers all of the city of Beaverton and many of those communities surrounding Beaverton in the Portland metropolitan area. Tualatin Hills operates over 200 facilities totaling , including eight swimming centers. The district has an annual budget of $40 million and is overseen by a five-person board of directors.

History
Around 1953 some members of Parent-Teacher Associations (PTA) in Beaverton-area schools started campaigning to create a recreation district, as Beaverton had few parks at the time. This group organized a meeting of PTAs and other civic groups and then decided to create a formal group, the Tualatin Hills Park and Recreation Council. They drew up a constitution for the group, elected Elsie Stuhr as the president, and started holding board meetings in July 1953. At the first meeting they adopted the name for the proposed district.

This group then started collecting signatures on a petition in September 1953 in order to create a special parks district, and collected the planned 4,000 signatures by December 1953. They gathered additional signatures in order to compensate for any errors. A total of 4,400 signatures were collected and turned over in February 1954 to the county, which the county had required 27% of property owners to sign the petition.

Then beginning in June 1954 the then county court, now board of commissioners, held meetings to work out what the boundaries would be for the proposed district. School districts in the area that withdrew fully or in part from the proposal included Aloha, McKinley, Groner, Sunset Valley, McKay, Bethany, and Cooper Mountain. The district would be entirely within the boundaries of the then Beaverton Union High School District, which later through consolidation became the Beaverton School District.

Opposition came mainly from farmers within the district who objected to increased taxes. The main arguments in support of the district were that increased recreation activities would decrease juvenile delinquency and that facilities within the area would reduce travel costs. The district planned to construct a centrally located swimming pool as the first priority if the district was created. In March 1955, the proposal was submitted to voters in the planned district, and the formation of the district was approved by a vote of 1,054 to 852, on March 4. At that time the district included all of Garden Home, Beaverton, Bonny Slope, Raleigh Hills, and the Washington County portion of Sylvan. Parts of Cooper Mountain, Hazeldale, Sunset Valley, Cedar Mill, and McKay also were in the new district.

The district became the third parks district in Oregon, with two in Lane County already in existence. Stuhr was elected as one of the three original directors, and was then elected as president at the board's first meeting. She and the other two original directors of the district had been members of the Tualatin Hills Park and Recreation Council. When formed, the assessed value of the land in the district totaled $12 million, the population was about 22,000, and the budget for the first year was $65,000. William B. Pond was hired as the district's first superintendent in July 1955, and he started work in the position on September 1 at a salary of $7,500 per year.  

Voters in the district approved the issuing of a $10 million bond in November 1974, but voted down an increase in the tax base in May 1978. At that time the district had grown to over 30 parks and operated swimming pools at Beaverton High School, at Sunset High School, in Raleigh Hills, and at Somerset West-Rock Creek. The district opened a senior center in 1975 in Beaverton and named it after Elsie Stuhr.

In May 1985, two teenagers set booby traps at the district's Fir Grove Park, imitating traps they had seen in the movie First Blood, the first film in the Rambo series. 

These parks were in areas anticipated to be annexed by Hillsboro, as Hillsboro and Beaverton had agreed to a shared boundary to match school district lines, except in areas already annexed into one of those cities. Tualatin Hills received $1.1 million for the transfer of the parks. In 2004, Sports Illustrated named the district as its Sportstown for Oregon during the magazine's 50th anniversary year.

At that time the district's budget had grown to $41 million, the district served over 200,000 residents, and employed 203 people. Voters in the district approved a $100 million bond in November 2008 to both improve then existing parks and facilities, as well as purchase new park lands. It was the first bond measure passed in the district since 1996. In June 2009, Cooper Mountain Nature Park opened, with Tualatin Hills operating the Metro-owned park.

Facilities and details
Tualatin Hills is the largest independent parks district in Oregon, serving over 220,000 residents. An elected board of directors governs the district, which is headed by a president. The district's board of directors originally had three members, but now consists of five board members. Board members are elected to four-year terms. Board meetings are held monthly. Day-to-day operations of the district are overseen by the general manager (GM), which is Doug Menke who became GM in 2006. The GM oversees a total of 212 employees and an annual budget of $40 million.

Tualatin Hills has over 200 parks or facilities totaling , spread across  in eastern Washington County. Included in this are eight aquatic centers or outdoor swimming pools, one senior center, two nature parks, and 60 miles of trails. Major parks and facilities include the Howard M. Terpenning Recreation Complex (often locally called simply the "THPRD complex"), Conestoga Recreation and Aquatic Center, Cooper Mountain Nature Park, Tualatin Hills Nature Park, PCC Rock Creek Recreation Facility, and the Jenkins Estate. Tualatin Hills also operates a variety of athletic fields and facilities, many in-conjunction with the Beaverton School District. These include 189 soccer fields, 111 tennis courts, and 75 basketball courts, among others. A complete list of facilities is below.

Facility list

References

External links
 Tualatin Hills Park Foundation

 
Protected areas of Washington County, Oregon
Local government in Oregon
1955 establishments in Oregon
Park districts in Oregon